Hannelore Auer is an Austrian Schlager singer and film actress who managed the German singer Heino.

Personal life
Auer was romantically linked with Franz Antel and appeared in the Frau Wirtin series of the director. In 1968, she married Austrian prince Alfred (von) Auersperg (1936-1992) and after their divorce in 1979, married Heino. Heino has a son Uwe from his first marriage and an illegitimate daughter Petra, who was a suicide in 2003. Hannelore herself does not have any children.

Selected filmography
 I'm Marrying the Director (1960)
 Our Crazy Nieces (1963)
 Don't Fool with Me (1963)
...denn die Musik und die Liebe in Tirol (1963)
The Merry Wives of Tyrol (1964)
 Schweik's Awkward Years (1964)
 Holiday in St. Tropez (1964)
 Ich Kauf Mir Lieber Einen Tirolerhut (I prefer to buy a Tyrolean hat) (1965)
Come to the Blue Adriatic (1966)
 The Sinful Village (1966)
The Sweet Sins of Sexy Susan (1967)
Sexy Susan Sins Again (1968)

References

External links

1942 births
Living people
Austrian film actresses
20th-century Austrian actresses
Austrian pop singers
Austrian folk singers
20th-century Austrian women singers
Austrian expatriates in Germany
Schlager musicians
Musicians from Linz
Actors from Linz